Xiaoting Guo (born 2 January 1993), is a Chinese actress. She graduated from the Shanghai Theatre Academy in 2015. She is best known for her role in the dramas Chinese Paladin 3 (2009), We Are All Alone (2020), and The Blue Whisper (2022).

Early life and career
Guo Xiaoting was born in Shanghai on January 2, 1993. In 1999, Guo Xiaoting made her first debut in the drama Love Talks as a child actor. She then played child roles in serval dramas. She attended the Shanghai No. 3 Girls' High School. She became known for her role as Hua Ying in Chinese Paladin 3 (2009)。 She played a supporting role as Princess Suwan Guwalgiya-Minmin in Scarlet Heart (2011). At the same year, Guo Xiaoting attended the Shanghai Theater Academy. After graduation, she starred in her first leading role in The Great Shaolin in 2016. Since 2019, she gained more recognition for starring main roles as Liu Lixian in Once Upon a Time in Lingjian Mountain (2019), Lin Xiang in We Are All Alone (2020), Shunde Fairy/Ning Xiyu in The Blue Whisper (2022), and Chidi Nvzi in Love Between Fairy and Devil (2022).

Filmography

Television series

References

External links
 
 

Living people
1993 births
Chinese television actresses
21st-century Chinese actresses
Actresses from Shanghai
Shanghai Theatre Academy alumni